Raye-sur-Authie is a commune in the Pas-de-Calais department in the Hauts-de-France region of France.

Geography
Raye-sur-Authie is located 15 miles (24 km) southeast of Montreuil-sur-Mer on the D119 road, on the river Authie, the border with the Somme department.

Population

Places of interest
 The church of St.Liéphard, dating from the eighteenth century.
 A windmill

See also
Communes of the Pas-de-Calais department

References

Rayesurauthie
Artois